The 1955 Wake Forest Demon Deacons baseball team represented Wake Forest University in the 1955 NCAA baseball season. The team was coached by Taylor Sanford in his 5th season at Wake Forest.

The Demon Deacons won the College World Series, defeating the Western Michigan Broncos in the championship game.

Roster

Schedule 

! style="background:black;color:#AB9F6D;"| Regular Season
|- valign="top" 

|- align="center" bgcolor="#ddffdd"
|  || 19-6 || 1-0 || 1-0
|- align="center" bgcolor="#ddffdd"
|  || 14-5 || 2-0 || –
|- align="center" bgcolor="#ddffdd"
|  || 5-4 || 3-0 || –
|- align="center" bgcolor="#ddffdd"
|  || 6-2 || 4-0 || 2-0
|- align="center" bgcolor="#ffdddd"
|  || 5-4 || 4-1 || –
|- align="center" bgcolor="#ddffdd"
| Yale || 4-2 || 5-1 || –
|- align="center" bgcolor="#ddffdd"
|  || 9-2 || 6-1 || –
|- align="center" bgcolor="#ddffdd"
| NC State || 8-2 || 7-1 || –
|- align="center" bgcolor="#ddffdd"
|  || 2-0 || 8-1 || 3-0
|- align="center" bgcolor="#ffdddd"
|  || 2-7 || 8-2 || 3-1
|- align="center" bgcolor="#ddffdd"
| North Carolina || 9-5 || 9-2 || –
|- align="center" bgcolor="#ddffdd"
|  || 2-7 || 10-2 || 4-1
|- align="center" bgcolor="#ddffdd"
|  || 10-9 || 11-2 || –
|- align="center" bgcolor="#ffdddd"
| NC State || 4-7 || 11-3 || –
|- align="center" bgcolor="#ddffdd"
|  || 11-4 || 12-3 || 5-1
|- align="center" bgcolor="#ffdddd"
| North Carolina || 2-3 || 12-4 || 5-2
|- align="center" bgcolor="#ddffdd"
| Duke || 12-8 || 13-4 || 6-2
|- align="center" bgcolor="#ddffdd"
| Maryland || 4-2 || 14-4 || 7-2
|- align="center" bgcolor="#ddffdd"
|  || 9-5 || 15-4 || 8-2
|- align="center" bgcolor="#ddffdd"
| Clemson || 15-11 || 16-4 || 9-2
|- align="center" bgcolor="#ffdddd"
| NC State || 8-9 || 16-5 || 9-3
|- align="center" bgcolor="#ddffdd"
| East Carolina || 11-10 || 17-5 || –
|- align="center" bgcolor="#ddffdd"
| Duke || 12-5 || 18-5 || –
|- align="center" bgcolor="#ddffdd"
| Virginia || 4-2 || 19-5 || 10-3
|-

|-
! style="background:black;color:#AB9F6D;"| Post-Season
|-

|- align="center" bgcolor="ddffdd"
| vs.  || 5-1 || 20-5
|- align="center" bgcolor="ffdddd"
| vs. West Virginia || 7-9 || 20-6
|- align="center" bgcolor="ddffdd"
| vs. West Virginia || 6-5 || 21-6
|- align="center" bgcolor="ddffdd"
| vs. Rollins || 4-0 || 22-6
|- align="center" bgcolor="ffdddd"
| vs. Rollins || 6-2 || 23-6
|-

|- align="center" bgcolor="ddffdd"
| June 10 || vs.  || Rosenblatt Stadium || 1-0 || 24-6
|- align="center" bgcolor="ddffdd"
| June 12 || vs.  || Rosenblatt Stadium || 10-0 || 25-6
|- align="center" bgcolor="ffdddd"
| June 13 || vs. Western Michigan || Rosenblatt Stadium || 0-9 || 25-7
|- align="center" bgcolor="ddffdd"
| June 14 || vs. Western Michigan || Rosenblatt Stadium || 10-7 || 26-7
|- align="center" bgcolor="ddffdd"
| June 15 || vs.  || Rosenblatt Stadium || 2-0 || 27-7
|- align="center" bgcolor="ddffdd"
| June 16 || vs. Western Michigan || Rosenblatt Stadium || 7-6 || 28-7
|-

Awards and honors 
Bill Barnes
 All-ACC Second Team

Tommy Cole
 All-ACC First Team

Lefty Davis
 All-ACC First Team

Linwood Holt
 All-America First Team
 All-ACC First Team

Luther McKeel
 All-ACC First Team

Harold Moore
 All-ACC Second Team

References 

Wake Forest
Wake Forest Demon Deacons baseball seasons
College World Series seasons
NCAA Division I Baseball Championship seasons
Atlantic Coast Conference baseball champion seasons
Wake For